Ghetlova is a commune in Orhei District, Moldova. It is composed of three villages: Ghetlova, Hulboaca and Noroceni.

References

Communes of Orhei District